Sonnia Agu born 15 September, is a Nigerian social entrepreneur, inspirational speaker and philanthropist. She is the founder and CEO of The Sapio Club and G1st International Foundation.
 She is an executive board member of the Nigerian chapter of the Pan African Youth Commission. She is an ECOWAS Youth Ambassador. She was listed as one of Lagos state's most influential young persons in 2020.

Early life and education 
Sonnia was born in Lagos State, Nigeria and is originally from Okija in Anambra state. Sonnia began her education at Christland Nursery and Primary School Ikeja, Opebi Lagos State. For her secondary education, she attended the Federal Government Girls College (FGGC) Oyo State. She started out studying creative arts at the University of Lagos but left in her 3rd year to Eastern Mediterranean University, Cyprus where she graduated with a first-class degree in Media and Communications.

Post COVID-19, She got another educational achievement from MIT (Massachusetts institute of Technology) in Business and impact planning for social enterprises, making this a dual certification from Harvard and MIT.

In 2019, she enrolled at the Harvard Business School where she was certified with a passing grade as an Entrepreneur from an Emerging Economy. She also received a passing grade from OxfordX an initiative of Oxford University in Understanding Economic Development.

Career
In 2013, after returning to Nigeria from University in Cyprus, Sonnia Agu founded the G1st International Foundation a nonprofit organization passionate about Education, Civic Engagement and Community Development. G1st is short for God First.

Since its inception, G1st has collaborated internationally with organizations like Growth Foundation, London; SOS Foundation, Gambia; Lawrence Hope Foundation, South Africa and Food for Life, Hungary. In 2015, the Civic Engagement arm of the G1st Foundation was founded, tagged the Sapiosexual Club or The Sapio Club, which is registered with the Nigerian Federal Ministry of Trade and Investment and has both local and international membership and currently has at least 10,000 members from various walks of life.

Awards and recognition

In 2013, Sonnia Agu worked under the office of the Special Adviser to the President on Ethics and Morals, Mrs. Sarah Jibril where she co-founded the initiative Youths on Ethics and Social Responsibility (YES). In February 2014, she was part of the team that hosted Nigeria's Centenary celebration, tagged A Nation United, which was hosted by  President Goodluck Ebele Jonathan.

Sonnia Agu was part of a round table hosted by Mrs. Amina Saliuh, which had a mandate to discuss issues of education and gender mainstreaming at the National Assembly, Abuja in 2015 and in 2016, she received the Lagos State Award of Excellence for her contribution to the growth and development of education in the Ajegunle, a suburb of Lagos state.

Sonnia Agu received the 2018 West African Leadership Summit Award for Community Development in recognition of her "exemplary leadership, selfless service, and dedication to the socio-economic development of West Africa". In June 2018, she participated in the round table discussion "Not Another Nigerian Idea", a project geared towards countering violent extremism hosted by NERI (North East Regional Initiative).

Sonnia Agu represented Nigeria in Gambia, at the African Youth Commission's 3rd Pan African Conference hosted by the United Nations Population Fund (UNFPA), to analyze and brainstorm on methodologies for the achievement of the United Nation's 2063 United Africa Goal in 2019.

In December 2019, Sonnia Agu represented Nigeria at the World Youth Forum, which held in Cairo, Egypt, where she was selected by the Egyptian president Abdelfattah El-Sisi as an African Women Ambassador.

In April 2022, she  was given an award as "an Achiever per Excellence" by the National Association of Northern Nigerian Students (NANNS).

References 

Nigerian philanthropists
1988 births
Living people